General Ott may refer to:

Charles A. Ott Jr. (1920–2006), U.S. Army major general 
Eugen Ott (ambassador) (1889–1977), German Army generalmajor
Eugen Ott (general) (1890–1966), German Wehrmacht general

See also
Friedrich-Wilhelm Otte (1898–1944), German Wehrmacht general